In enzymology, a hydrogen dehydrogenase is an enzyme that catalyzes the chemical reaction

H2 + NAD+  H+ + NADH

Thus, the two substrates of this enzyme are H2 and NAD+, whereas its two products are H+ and NADH.

This enzyme belongs to the family of oxidoreductases, specifically those acting on hydrogen as donor with NAD+ or NADP+ as acceptor.  The systematic name of this enzyme class is hydrogen:NAD+ oxidoreductase. Other names in common use include H2:NAD+ oxidoreductase, NAD+-linked hydrogenase, bidirectional hydrogenase, and hydrogenase.  This enzyme participates in glyoxylate and dicarboxylate metabolism and methane metabolism.  It has 6 cofactors: FAD, Iron, FMN, Flavin, Nickel,  and Iron-sulfur.

References

 
 

EC 1.12.1
NADH-dependent enzymes
Flavoproteins
Iron enzymes
Nickel enzymes
Iron-sulfur enzymes
Enzymes of unknown structure